This is a list of trade unions in Canada.

Canadian Labour Congress

National Affiliates
Alliance of Canadian Cinema, Television and Radio Artists
British Columbia Teachers' Federation
Canadian Association of University Teachers
Canadian Office and Professional Employees Union
Canadian Postmasters and Assistants Association
Canadian Union of Postal Workers
Canadian Union of Public Employees
Elementary Teachers' Federation of Ontario
Manitoba Teachers' Society
National Union of Public and General Employees
Canadian Federation of Nurses Unions
Ontario English Catholic Teachers' Association
Ontario Secondary School Teachers' Federation
Public Service Alliance of Canada
Professional Institute of the Public Service of Canada

International Affiliates
Air Line Pilots Association, International
Amalgamated Transit Union
American Federation of Musicians
Bakery, Confectionery, Tobacco Workers and Grain Millers' International Union
CWA-Canadian Media Guild
International Alliance of Theatrical Stage Employees, Moving Picture Technicians, Artists and Allied Crafts of the United States, its Territories and Canada
International Association of Bridge, Structural, Ornamental and Reinforcing Iron Workers
International Association of Fire Fighters
International Association of Heat and Frost Insulators and Asbestos Workers
International Association of Machinists and Aerospace Workers
International Brotherhood of Electrical Workers
International Brotherhood of Boilermakers, Iron Ship Builders, Blacksmiths, Forgers and Helpers
International Federation of Professional and Technical Engineers
International Longshore and Warehouse Union
International Longshoremen's Association
International Union of Bricklayers and Allied Craftworkers
International Union of Elevator Constructors
International Union of Operating Engineers
International Union of Painters and Allied Trades
Laborers' International Union of North America
Operative Plasterers' and Cement Masons' International Association
Seafarers' International Union of Canada
Service Employees International Union
Workers United Canada Council
Sheet Metal Workers International Association
United Auto Workers
United Brotherhood of Carpenters and Joiners of America
United Food and Commercial Workers Union
United Mine Workers of America
United Steelworkers
United Transportation Union
United Association of Journeymen and Apprentices of the Plumbing and Pipe Fitting Industry
UNITE HERE

Independent Unions/Other Afflictions
Alliance des professeures et professeurs de Montréal
Canadian Actors' Equity Association
Centrale des syndicats du Québec
Christian Labour Association of Canada
Confédération des syndicats nationaux
Congress of Democratic Trade Unions (Quebec)
Confederation of Canadian Unions
Industrial Workers of the World
Major League Baseball Players Association
National Hockey League Players' Association
National Police Federation
Professional Association of Foreign Service Officers
Teaching Support Staff Union
Teamsters Canada
Writers Guild of Canada
Unifor

See also
List of trade unions in Quebec
List of trade unions
List of trade unions in the United States
Affiliated unions of the Canadian Labour Congress
Canadian labour law
Canadian Labour Code

Notes

External links

 
Canada
Trade unions